Eugène Marsan (1882–1936) was a French author and literary critic. He won the Prix Vitet from the Académie française in 1936.

Works

Further reading

References

1882 births
1936 deaths
People from Bari
French biographers